Inhale is the fourth studio album of the Greek synthpop duo Marsheaux. It features 1980s-style synthpop.

Reception

The Sonic Seducer's reviewer noted, that Inhale had probably surpassed the musical quality of Marsheaux's long-term role model The Human League. According to the Release Magazine, the album is Marsheaux's "most advanced effort" but was still deemed slightly weaker than the previous release Lumineux Noir.

Track listing

Standard edition 

In addition, there was a limited edition bonus CD, containing remixes of Inhale, Can You Stop Me, and August Day, as well as remixes of the track "So Far," from their earlier CD, Lumineux Noir.

References

External links
 Official site
 Undo Records site

2013 albums
Marsheaux albums